The OPS-24 is a shipborne three-dimensional air search radar adopting active electronically scanned array (AESA) technology. 

OPS-24 was developed by the Technical Research and Development Institute (TRDI) of the Ministry of Defence, and manufactured by the Mitsubishi Electric. It is also being used on the Murasame and s.

References

Military radars of Japan
Naval radars
Mitsubishi_Electric_products,_services_and_standards
Japan Maritime Self-Defense Force
Military equipment introduced in the 1980s